Dury  (German Döhringshof) is a village in the administrative district of Gmina Morąg, within Ostróda County, Warmian-Masurian Voivodeship, in northern Poland.

The village has a population of 40.

References

Dury